Academia Rossica (London/Moscow) is a cultural organisation set up in 2000 to promote and strengthen cultural and intellectual ties between Russia and the West, pioneering intercultural projects and bringing the best of contemporary Russian culture to the West. With offices in London and Moscow, Academia Rossica acts as a bridge between these two thriving cultural capitals. Academia Rossica is a non-profit organization, and a UK registered charity.

About

Academia Rossica runs a programme of cultural events, including the London Russian Film Festival and aims to provide a platform for intellectual exchange between Russia and the UK through the Russian Publishers stand at the London Book Fair. Academia Rossica invites contemporary Russian writers and critics for a programme of seminars and discussions during the SLOVO Festival. There are also two literary translation awards presented by Academia Rossica: The Rossica Prize, for the best literary translation from Russian into English, and the Rossica Young Translators Prize, for anyone under 25.

Film
London Russian Film Festival

Presenting new Russian Films, the London Russian Film Festival is a key event in UK's cultural calendar. From its beginning in 2007, it has showcased the best new award-winning films, thought provoking documentaries and wonderfully imaginative animations, as well as selected retrospectives. All films have English subtitles. The festival is also a unique chance for UK audiences to meet international award-winning directors, world-famous actors and major producers at masterclasses and special events.

Russian-British Co-Production and Distribution Forum

In 2011, Academia Rossica, supported by the Russian Cinema Fund and in partnership with the British Film Institute, launched this new initiative between the Russian and British film industries, as part of the Russian film festival.
The forum brings together leading UK and Russian film professionals, helping to integrate Russian cinema into the international cultural scene, and explores and develops opportunities of collaboration and partnership.

Kinoklub

KinoKlub, London's premier Russian Film Club, launched at the Apollo Piccadilly in 2011 to great success. It shows the best of new Russian films with English subtitles every month, introduced by directors, actors and producers. The club is open to the public, with members entitled to special rates and exclusive members-only events.

Literature

READ RUSSIA!, London Book Fair, BookExpo America and other international book fairs

With the support of the Russian Federal Agency for Press and Mass Communications, Rospechat, Academia Rossica organises the official Russian pavilion at several international book fairs, with the aim of encouraging the integration of Russian publishers into the international publishing industry, as well as the global promotion of Russian literature. Academia Rossica represents the key Russian publishers at the major international book fairs as well as organises extensive industry focused programmes of seminars and discussions with the participation of the leading contemporary Russian writers and critics.
2011 saw Russia celebrated as the Guest of Honour at the London Book Fair. The event was highlighted by President Dmitry Medvedev as a key example of strong cultural relations between Russia and Great Britain at a joint press conference with David Cameron.

SLOVO Russian Literature Festival. Words in action!

Launched in 2008, SLOVO festival features the best in contemporary Russian fiction, explores the vibrant world of new Russian poetry and represents the breadth of Russian non-fiction. The annual festival brings the most acclaimed contemporary Russian authors to the UK to holds diverse readings, discussions and in venues across London and the rest of the country, building stronger cultural and intellectual links between Russian and Britain.

The International Lounge at the Moscow International Book Fair

With the support of the Russian Federal Agency for Press and Mass Communications Rospechat, Academia Rossica organises the International Lounge at Russia's biggest book fair. The MIBF International Lounge is a space specially designed to help international publishers explore Russia's literary scene and seek out business opportunities in Russia. The lounge assists collaboration between Russian and international publishers.

Journal

Academia Rossica publishes Rossica, a high-quality arts journal, which covers a wide range of topics presenting the best and most original in contemporary Russian writing and art, architecture and film. It provides a unique insight into both Russia's enigmatic history and its latest cultural events and developments.

The Rossica Translation Prize

The Rossica Translation Prize is the only prize in the world awarded for the best new translation of Russian literature into English. It aims to raise the international profile of translators and the art of literary translation, as well as that of contemporary Russian literature. The prize is open to works published in any country. The value of the prize is £5,000, divided between the winning translator and the publisher.

The Rossica Young Translators Award

The Rossica Young Translators Prize was set up alongside the Rossica Prize in 2009 to inspire a new generation of young translators and expose them to the best of contemporary Russian literature. Every year budding literary translators from universities around the globe compete for the recognition of their talent and the chance to kick-start a professional career as literary translators.

References

External links
Academia Rossica homepage

Arts organisations based in the United Kingdom
Russian diaspora in the United Kingdom